Downtown Battle Mountain II is the fourth studio album by American rock band Dance Gavin Dance, released on March 8, 2011, on Rise Records. The album is a non-direct sequel to the band's full-length debut studio album, Downtown Battle Mountain (2007), and sees the return of original members, vocalists Jonny Craig and Jon Mess, and bass guitarist Eric Lodge. It also serves as a follow-up to the band's third studio album, Happiness (2009) and was produced by Kris Crummett. The album is the group's second studio album, and third and final release overall, to feature Jonny Craig upon rejoining the band in 2010. Craig later departed from the line-up in August 2012. Upon its release, the album debuted at No. 82 on the Billboard 200 while the Hot Topic deluxe version debuted at No. 190 on the Billboard 200 in the same week.

Downtown Battle Mountain II was announced in late-2010. The lead single, "Heat Seeking Ghost of Sex", was released on January 24, 2011. The second single, "The Robot with Human Hair, Pt. 2½", was released shortly after, on January 28. The third and final single, "Pounce Bounce", was released on June 7, to promote the 2011 Vans Warped Tour compilation album. The band toured on the Downtown Battle Mountain II Tour in Europe and North America and also toured on the 2011 Vans Warped Tour and the 2012 All Stars Tour. On September 27, 2019, the band released an instrumental version of the album to streaming and digital download platforms.

Track listing

Personnel 

Dance Gavin Dance
 Jonny Craig – clean vocals
 Jon Mess – unclean vocals
 Will Swan – guitar, rapping (on "Spooks", "Heat Seeking Ghost of Sex", & 	"Privilously Poncheezied"), unclean vocals (on "Need Money" & "People You Knew")
 Eric Lodge – bass guitar
 Matt Mingus – drums, percussion

Production
 Kris Crummett – production, engineering, mixing, mastering
 Brian Obedowski – mixing assistant
 Kyle Hubbard – trumpet on track 5
 Mattias Adolfsson – album artwork
 Phill Mamula – layout
 Management by Eric Rushing

Charts

References

External links 
Downtown Battle Mountain II Artwork – AbsolutePunk.net
Dance Gavin Dance Myspace

2011 albums
Dance Gavin Dance albums
Rise Records albums
Albums produced by Kris Crummett
Sequel albums